Harry Márquez was appointed on November 27, 2012, by Puerto Rico's Secretary of State, acting as Acting Governor, Kenneth McClintock as the third Secretary of the Treasury of Governor Luis Fortuño's administration, succeeding Jesús F. Méndez.

Prior to his appointment, Márquez serves as Assistant Secretary for Internal Revenue.  Márquez is expected to serve during the waning days of the Fortuño Administration until December 31, 2012.  His appointment will not require Senate confirmation since his term ends before the Senate of Puerto Rico convenes for its next regular session on January 14, 2013.

References

Living people
Secretaries of Treasury of Puerto Rico
Year of birth missing (living people)
Place of birth missing (living people)